Jack Terry (born Jakub Szabmacher; March 10, 1930 – October 30, 2022) was a Polish-American author. In World War II, he was the youngest surviving prisoner of the concentration camp in Flossenbürg.

Life 
Terry was one of four children born of a Jewish merchant family named Szabmacher. He grew up in Bełżyce, Poland. Under German occupation, his father was first deported to the Majdanek Concentration Camp. Bełżyce was in the Izbica Gestapo, Kurt Engels region, and Terry witnessed several murders. In October 1942, he and his family were expelled from the city together with the Jews still living there. When he realized that his mother was not in the column of deportees, he fled back to his hometown. There he found his mother and sister. His brother had been shot during the expulsion. At the beginning of 1943, the surviving members of the Szabmacher family were taken from the Bełżyce Ghetto to the Budzyń concentration camp near the town of Krasnik in eastern Poland. While there he witnessed SS officer Reinhold Feix shoot his mother and sister during a selection on May 8, 1943. Terry was made to work in the aircraft yard of Budzyn's Ernst Heinkel aircraft works. As the Red Army approached, he was moved to an airplane production site in a salt mash at Wieliczka, and finally to Flossenbürg concentration camp at the beginning of August 1944. He first worked in a quarry, and later for aircraft factory, and during the last three months before the liberation in the prisoners' laundry.

Terry was saved several times in Flossenburg by an inmate named Carl Schrade, a Swiss trader arrested in Berlin in 1934 for criticizing National Socialism. When liberated in 1945 he was the longest-held concentration-camp prisoner in Nazi Germany.

On April 8, 1945, the SS began to evacuate Flossenbürg camp under the pressure from advancing US troops. The commander, Max Koegel, sent prisoners on a death march to Dachau concentration camp. Inmates hid the 15-year-old Terry in a tube tunnel that led from the laundry to the kitchen. When the US Army entered the camp on April 23, 1945, he was the youngest prisoner and the only member of his family to survive the Holocaust.

A US colonel took him out of the orphanage and to the US. Terry returned to Germany in the 1950s as a US soldier stationed in Heidelberg. In the US, he studied geology psychoanalysis, and later lived in New York City.

In 1995 he returned to Flossenburg for the 50th anniversary of its liberation and to meet former prisoners. Since then, Terry has been visited Flossenbürg annually. He is a member of the foundation board of the Stiftung Bayerische Gedenkstätten and spokesman for former prisoners of Flossenbürg. Author Jakub Welt told Terry's story in a 2005 book. In January 2011 ZDFneo aired a 45-minute documentary The Two Lives of Jack Terry.

Terry was awarded the Bavarian Order of Merit in July 2007 for his outstanding citizenship.

He died on October 30, 2022, aged 92.

References

Jack Terry (Author), Alicia Nitetzky (trans.): Jakub's World - The Memories of Jack Terry. Bavarian State Center for Political Education, Munich 2005.
Talk with Jack Terry: " Civilization is a very thin varnish over human nature " in the BLZ report, ed. 4/03, ed .: Bavarian State Center for Political Education
Report at Frontal21 on September 1, 2009

1930 births
2022 deaths
American people of Polish-Jewish descent
Flossenbürg concentration camp survivors
People from Lublin County